K105 or K-105 may refer to:

K-105 (Kansas highway), a state highway in Kansas
HMS Loosestrife, a former UK Royal Navy ship

See also
WKHM-FM, a radio station